Youliu was a chanyu of the Xiongnu Empire. Although he was a descendant of his predecessor Punu, it is not known what their exact relationship was. He succeeded Punu at an uncertain date and was killed by the Xianbei in 87 AD.

Upon taking power, Youliu withdrew to distant defences in the face of pressure from the Xianbei, Southern Xiongnu, and Han dynasty.

In 84 AD, Youliu attempted to negotiate trade with the Administrator of Wuwei Commandery, but the Southern Xiongnu plundered and kidnapped the traders.

In 85 AD, Youliu threatened to resume raids on Han territory. As appeasement, the Han ordered the Southern Xiongnu to ransom prisoners taken from the north. However this only strengthened the Southern Xiongnu as it rewarded them for attacking northern trade caravans.

In 87 AD, the Xianbei attacked Youliu and killed him. They stripped the skin off of him and his followers and took the skin back with them as trophies. The Northern Xiongnu court fell into chaos and two contenders for the title of chanyu appeared. Although they were never named, one of them known as the Northern Chanyu was defeated in 89 AD at the Battle of the Altai Mountains by the Han general Dou Xian, effectively ending Xiongnu power in the steppes.

Footnotes

References

Bichurin N.Ya., "Collection of information on peoples in Central Asia in ancient times", vol. 1, Sankt Petersburg, 1851, reprint Moscow-Leningrad, 1950

Taskin B.S., "Materials on Sünnu history", Science, Moscow, 1968, p. 31 (In Russian)

Chanyus
1st-century monarchs in Asia
87 deaths